Roger Short MVO (9 December 1944 – 20 November 2003) was a British diplomat who was killed on 20 November 2003 in a truck bombing in Istanbul while serving as the British Consul-General in Turkey. The bombing killed at least 27 people and may have been targeted directly at Short and his consul staff because they were representatives of the United Kingdom.

Short was educated at Malvern College and University College, Oxford. He joined the British Foreign Office in 1969  and was widely considered to be an expert in Turkish affairs. While he had been posted in Turkey for most of his career, he also served as consul-general in Oslo and was the British ambassador to Bulgaria in 1994.

External links
 Obituary: Roger Short news.bbc.co.uk. 20 November 2003. Retrieved 28 July 2008.
 Roger Short - Diplomat with a special love of Turkey. www.timesonline.co.uk. 21 November 2003. Retrieved 20 July 2010.

1944 births
2003 deaths
Assassinated British diplomats
Deaths by car bomb in Turkey
Alumni of University College, Oxford
British terrorism victims
Terrorism deaths in Turkey
British people murdered abroad
Members of the Royal Victorian Order
People murdered in Turkey
People educated at Malvern College
Ambassadors of the United Kingdom to Bulgaria
People killed by al-Qaeda
20th-century British diplomats
21st-century British diplomats
Victims of Islamic terrorism
2003 murders in Turkey